Monica Lamb-Powell or Monica Lamb (born October 11, 1964) is an American former basketball player. She played for the Houston Comets in the WNBA and US National Teams. She is now the founder and president of the Monica Lamb Wellness Foundation.

Lamb played on the 1983 World University games team, coached by Jill Hutchison. She helped the team win the gold medal for the USA team.

Lamb was selected to be a member of the team representing the US at the 1987 World University Games held in Zagreb, Yugoslavia. The USA team won four of the five contests. In the opening game against Poland, Lamb was the second leading scorer for the US with 16 points. After winning their next game against Finland, the USA faced the host team Yugoslavia. The game went to overtime, but Yugoslavia prevailed, 93–89. The USA faced China in the next game. They won 84–83, but they needed to win by at least five points to remain in medal contention. They won the final game against Canada to secure fifth place. Lamb averaged 11.4 points per games, tied for first on the team. She averaged 4.6 rebounds per game, second most on the team.

Houston and USC statistics

Source

References

External links 
 About Monica at the Monica Lamb Wellness Foundation

1964 births
Living people
American expatriate basketball people in Italy
American expatriate basketball people in Spain
Centers (basketball)
Houston Comets players
Houston Cougars women's basketball players
USC Trojans women's basketball players
American women's basketball players
Basketball players from Houston
Universiade gold medalists for the United States
Universiade medalists in basketball